Andrew Marshall (born June 22, 1990) is a Canadian football defensive lineman who is currently a free agent. He was most recently a member of the Edmonton Eskimos of the Canadian Football League (CFL). He played CIS football and NCAA football at Simon Fraser University and attended Ballenas Secondary School in Parksville, British Columbia. He has also been a member of the Calgary Stampeders, BC Lions, and Ottawa Redblacks.

Professional career

Calgary Stampeders
Marshall was signed by the Calgary Stampeders on April 25, 2013. He was released by the Stampeders on June 23, 2013.

BC Lions
Marshall signed with the BC Lions on July 8, 2013. He played in his first career game on September 27, 2013 against the Winnipeg Blue Bombers.

Ottawa Redblacks
Marshall was drafted by the Ottawa Redblacks in the third round of the 2013 CFL Expansion Draft. He played in 82 games from 2014 to 2018 with the club and recorded 12 defensive tackles, 56 special teams tackles, three sacks, one interception, and two forced fumbles over that time. He also played in three Grey Cup games, winning the 104th Grey Cup in 2016. He became a free agent on February 12, 2019.

Edmonton Eskimos
On February 22, 2019, it was announced that Marshall had signed with the Edmonton Eskimos. He spent the 2019 season on the six-game injury list due to an injury endured in training camp. He was later released on January 17, 2020.

References

External links
Edmonton Eskimos bio
Just Sports Stats
Ottawa Redblacks bio 

Living people
1990 births
Players of Canadian football from British Columbia
Canadian football defensive linemen
Simon Fraser Clan football players
BC Lions players
Ottawa Redblacks players
Edmonton Elks players
Canadian players of American football
People from Parksville, British Columbia